The following is a list of football stadiums in Slovakia, ordered by capacity. The minimum required capacity is 1,000.

Largest football stadiums

See also
List of European stadiums by capacity
List of association football stadiums by capacity

External links
Stadiums in Slovakia

 
Slovakia
stadiums
Football stadiums